Taptukemre is a village in the Aksaray District, Aksaray Province, Turkey. Its population is 187 (2021). The village is populated by Kurds.

References

Villages in Aksaray District
Kurdish settlements in Aksaray Province